Marwood is a civil parish in County Durham, England. It had a population of 529 at the 2011 Census.

History 
Marwood was a township in Gainford parish. In 1866 Marwood became a civil parish in its own right until 1884, in 1894 Marwood became a parish again.

References

Civil parishes in County Durham